John Peachey may refer to:

John Peachey, 2nd Baron Selsey (1749–1816), British politician
John Peachey (footballer) (born 1952), English footballer